Founded by Claudine André in 1994, Lola ya Bonobo is the world's only sanctuary for orphaned bonobos.  Since 2002, the sanctuary has been located just south of the suburb of Kimwenza  at the Petites Chutes de la Lukaya, Kinshasa, in the Democratic Republic of the Congo.

Lola ya Bonobo means 'paradise for bonobos' in Lingala, the main language of Kinshasa. Lola ya Bonobo is home to about 60 bonobos who live in 30 hectares of primary forest.

Lola ya Bonobo is a member of the Pan African Sanctuary Alliance.

Typically, bonobos arrive as young infants. The bushmeat trade in the Congo area sees hundreds of bonobos killed each year for meat. The infants are sold as pets. When confiscated, these young bonobos are taken to Lola ya Bonobo. They start a new life at the sanctuary with close care from a substitute human mother, but are usually quickly ready to be integrated into a peer group, and shortly afterwards into one of the large, mixed-age social groups.

Although the bonobos are captive, they live in an environment similar to the wild. They can forage among dozens of edible plants and fruiting trees, compete for mating opportunities, and learn to avoid dangers such as stepping on venomous snakes just as they would in the wild. As a result, the bonobos at the Lola ya Bonobo sanctuary, living in their forested microcosm, show all the naturally occurring behaviors observed in wild bonobos (in fact, they actually display some behaviors such as tool use that have not been observed in the wild).

Because of the living conditions provided, the sanctuary can play a critical role by demonstrating the level of humane treatment that captive apes deserve. The sanctuary also protects wild bonobos since it triggers the enforcement of domestic and international conservation laws aimed at preventing the trade in live bonobos. The sanctuary also acts as a mouthpiece for conservation efforts in DRC by educating thousands of Congolese visitors each year about the value of Congo's natural history, in particular the bonobo – their unique Congolese inheritance.

Friends of Bonobos
Friends of Bonobos is a US 501(c)(3) charity that supports Lola ya Bonobo sanctuary and all the activities of its parent organization, Amis des Bonobos du Congo. It was founded by Claudine André and Dominique Morel. Friends of Bonobos also raises awareness for bonobos globally. You can find them at www.bonobos.org. Friends of Bonobos is located in Durham, NC.

Notes

References 
 Andre, C., Kamate, C., Mbonzo, P., Morel, D., Hare, B. 2008. The conservation value of Lola ya Bonobo Sanctuary.
 Takesi, I., Thompson, J. (Eds) Bonobos Revisited: ecology, behavior, genetics, and conservation. Springer, New York.
Woods, Vanessa. Bonobo Handshake: A Memoir of Love and Adventure in the Congo. Gotham, 2010.

External links
 Lola ya Bonobo
 Friends of Bonobos
 Une Tendresse Sauvage

Bonobos
Nature conservation in the Democratic Republic of the Congo
Wildlife sanctuaries of Africa
Tourist attractions in the Democratic Republic of the Congo
Kinshasa

de:Claudine André#Lola ya Bonobo